Michael E. Hochberg is an American population biologist. He is currently a Research Director at the Centre National de la Recherche Scientifique, University of Montpellier, France, and a member of the External Faculty at the Santa Fe Institute.

Career
Hochberg received his BSc in bioresource sciences at the University of California Berkeley in 1982, MSc in entomological sciences at University of California Berkeley in 1985, PhD in pure and applied biology at the University of London in 1989, and was postdoctoral fellow at the NERC Centre for Population Biology, Imperial College from 1989 to 1991. In 1997, Hochberg received the CNRS Silver Medal for excellence in research. He founded in 1997 and served until 2008 as the first editor-in-chief of the journal Ecology Letters. In 2009 he was a visiting professor at the Miller Institute at U.C. Berkeley and in 2013–2014 Fellow at the Wissenschaftskolleg zu Berlin. He is currently section head of population ecology at the Faculty of 1000 and director of the French Darwinian Evolution of Cancer Consortium.

Research
Hochberg works on interdisciplinary applications of evolutionary theory including host-parasite coevolution, antibiotic resistance, social evolution, and cancer evolution. Beginning in 2013, Hochberg began to work on  evolutionary rescue, a relatively new theory about how organisms escape extinction that integrates traditional adaptation theory with stochasticity and demographics.

Selected works
 Edited books and journals

 Articles

References

External links
 Website
 Darwinian Evolution of Cancer Consortium
 Médaille d'argent du CNRS

1960 births
Living people
21st-century American biologists
UC Berkeley College of Natural Resources alumni
Alumni of the University of London
Academic staff of the University of Montpellier
Santa Fe Institute people